Mordecai Mokiach (Eisenstadt, also Mordechai Ben Hayyim of Eisenstadt) (c. 1650 in Alsace – May 18, 1729 in Pressburg) was a Jewish Sabbatean prophet and Messiah claimant.

The death of Sabbatai Zevi (1676) seems to have encouraged his followers, who claimed that he had returned to his heavenly abode and would come back in three years to finish his "Messianic" task. This doctrine was preached by Mordecai, who, through his ascetic life, his eloquence, and his commanding appearance, won many followers. Italian kabbalists, among them Behr Perlhefter, the first Maggid in the study hall of Abraham Rovigo, and Benjamin ben Eliezer ha-Kohen, rabbi of Reggio, called him to Italy about 1678, where he was very popular for a time. Something, perhaps fear of the Inquisition, forced him to leave Italy, where he had begun to announce himself as the Messiah. He traveled as a preacher through Austria, Germany, and Poland, and finally returned to Hungary, where he seems to have lived a quiet life, as nothing further is known of him. His son, Judah Löb Mokiach, an eminent Talmudist, died in Pressburg on December 7, 1742; the latter's sons were David Berlin (Mokiach) and Isaiah Berlin (Mokiach), known also as Isaiah Pick.

References 
  (German)
 Avraham Elqayam|Elqayam, Avraham: The Rebirth of the Messiah: New Discovery of R. Issachar Baer Perlhefter", Kabbalah: Journal for the Study of Jewish Mystical Text, 1 (1996), pp. 85-166 (Hebrew).
 Michael Heyd, "The ‘Jewish Quaker’: Christian Perceptions of Shabbatai Zevi as an Enthusiast," in Allison Coudert and Jeffrey Shoulson (eds.), Hebraica Veritas? Christian Hebraists, Jews, and the Study of Judaism in Early Modern Europe, Philadelphia, University of Pennsylvania Press, 2004, pp. 234-265; p. 244, and p. 261, n. 54.
 Bibliography of Jewish Encyclopedia
 Heinrich Grätz, Gesch. 3d ed., x. 303-304, 456-459
 Jewish Encyclopedia article on Mordecai Mokiach (by Gotthard Deutsch)

1650s births
1729 deaths
17th-century French people
18th-century French people
17th-century German people
18th-century German people
17th-century Hungarian people
18th-century Hungarian people
17th-century Jews
18th-century Jews
Sabbateans
Alsatian Jews
People from Eisenstadt
German expatriates in Italy
German expatriates in Austria
German expatriates in Poland
Hungarian people of French descent
Hungarian people of German descent
Jewish messiah claimants
Prophets in Judaism